Historic Oakwood Cemetery was founded in 1869 in North Carolina's capital, Raleigh, near the North Carolina State Capitol in the city's Historic Oakwood neighborhood. Historic Oakwood Cemetery contains two special areas within its , the Confederate Cemetery, located on the original two and one-half acres (1 ha), and the Hebrew Cemetery, both given for that purpose by Henry Mordecai in 1867.

Notable burials
 George B. Anderson, Confederate Army general
 Charles B. Aycock, Governor of North Carolina
 Cora Lily Woodard Aycock, First Lady of North Carolina and President of the North Carolina Railroad
 George Edmund Badger, US Congressman
 Josiah W. Bailey, US Senator
 John Heritage Bryan, US Congressman
 William Horn Battle, jurist and law professor
 Kemp P. Battle, lawyer, businessman, and educator
 Thomas Bragg, Governor of North Carolina
 Carrie Lougee Broughton, political figure
 Needham B. Broughton, North Carolina State Librarian
 Henry King Burgwyn, Jr., Confederate Army officer
 Lorenzo Charles, basketball player
 William Ruffin Cox, Confederate Army general
 Josephus Daniels, Newspaper publisher and political figure
 Elizabeth Edwards, attorney, author, and health care activist
 William G. Enloe, businessman and political figure
 Thad A. Eure, political figure
 Daniel Gould Fowle, Governor of North Carolina
 Winder Russell Harris, US Congressman
 Jesse Helms, US Senator
 Robert Hoke, Confederate Army general
 William Woods Holden, Governor of North Carolina
 Cornelia Petty Jerman, North Carolina suffragist
 Nell Battle Lewis, journalist and lawyer

 Augustus S. Merrimon, US Senator
 Dan K. Moore, Governor of North Carolina
 Jeanelle C. Moore, First Lady of North Carolina
 Leonidas L. Polk, journalist and political figure
 Edwin G. Reade, US Congressman
 William Nathan Harrell Smith, US Congressman
 Willis Smith, US Congressman
 David L. Swain, Governor of North Carolina
 Thomas F. Toon, Confederate Army general
 Jim Valvano, college basketball coach
 Carle Augustus Woodruff, Civil War Medal of Honor recipient
 Jonathan Worth, Governor of North Carolina

References

External links
 
 
 

Cemeteries in North Carolina
Cemeteries on the National Register of Historic Places in North Carolina
Geography of Raleigh, North Carolina
Tourist attractions in Raleigh, North Carolina
Protected areas of Wake County, North Carolina
Historic district contributing properties in North Carolina
National Register of Historic Places in Wake County, North Carolina
1869 establishments in North Carolina